David Pugh (born 14 May 1959) and Dafydd Rogers (born 5 May 1969), are two West End and Broadway theatre producers.

Pugh and Rogers first produced 'Art' by Yazmina Reza, translated by Christopher Hampton, starring Albert Finney, Tom Courtenay and Ken Stott at the Wyndhams Theatre in the West End of London.  It subsequently ran for eight years with twenty-six cast changes, winning the Evening Standard Theatre Award and The Olivier Award.

Their production of 'Art' starring Alan Alda, Victor Garber and Alfred Molina opened on Broadway at the Royale Theatre, winning the Tony Award for Best Play.

Their production of the jukebox musical "The Blues Brothers" played in London's West End for four separate seasons, toured throughout the world for fifteen years and was nominated for The Olivier Award for Best Entertainment.

Pugh and Rogers also produced The Play What I Wrote by Hamish McColl and Sean Foley, directed by Kenneth Branagh at the Wyndham's Theatre, which won the Laurence Olivier Award for Best New Comedy. It opened at the Lyceum Theatre on Broadway and was nominated for the Tony Award for Best Special Theatrical Event.

This was followed by Tom Stoppard's adaptation of Gérald Sibleyras' play Heroes starring Richard Griffiths, John Hurt and Ken Stott at the Wyndham's Theatre in 2005, which also won the Olivier Award for Best New Comedy.

Pugh and Rogers then produced Equus in London's West End, which starred Richard Griffiths and Daniel Radcliffe and played a sell-out season at the Gielgud Theatre.

Their production of God of Carnage by Yazmina Reza, again translated by Christopher Hampton, which played at the Gielgud Theatre and starred Ralph Fiennes, Tamsin Greig, Janet McTeer and Ken Stott, also won the Olivier Award for Best New Comedy.

In 2008 they originated and produced Kneehigh Theatre's production of Noël Coward's Brief Encounter, which played in an old cinema on the Haymarket in London and at Studio 54 on Broadway following a season at St Ann's Warehouse in New York. 
The UK tour subsequently won the TMA Award for Best Touring Production 2009.

God of Carnage opened on Broadway at the Jacobs Theatre in 2009 starring James Gandolfini, Marcia Gay Harden, Jeff Daniels and Hope Davis, winning Pugh and Rogers another Tony Award. Subsequent casts included Lucy Liu and Jimmy Smits.

Pugh and Rogers' production of Calendar Girls by Tim Firth, opened in 2009 in London's West End and became the most successful UK touring play of all time, grossing over 35 million pounds and winning the Whatsonstage Theatre Award.

Deathtrap by Ira Levin followed in 2010 at London's Noël Coward Theatre starring Simon Russell Beale, Jonathan Groff and Claire Skinner, where it played for a five-month season.

On 2 February 2013, Pugh and Rogers' production of a new play adaptation of the film The Full Monty by its original writer, Simon Beaufoy, opened at the Lyceum Theatre, Sheffield to enormous critical success, and followed by a tour of the UK and Ireland which continued through until May 2019 having won the UK Theatre Award for Best Touring Production

Pugh & Rogers's new musical The Girls, by Gary Barlow and Tim Firth was tried out at Leeds Grand Theatre and The Lowry Theatre, Manchester, where it received five star reviews and broke box office records. The Girls opened in London's West End, where it ran for six months and now, retitled Calendar Girls The Musical, the production has embarked on a 60-week national tour.

The Band, the Take That musical, written by Tim Firth and co-produced by Pugh & Rogers and Take That, opened at Manchester Opera House in September 2017 becoming the fastest selling musical of all time as well as to rave reviews and has toured very successfully throughout the United Kingdom until March 2019, including a season at the Theatre Royal Haymarket in London's West End.

Credits
West End
 The Blues Brothers
 Art
 The Play What I Wrote
 Heroes (2005)
 Ducktastic (2005)
 Equus (2007)
 Brief Encounter (2008)
 God of Carnage (2008)
 Calendar Girls (2009)
 Deathtrap (2010)
 The Full Monty (2013)
 The Girls (2017)
 The Band (2018)

Broadway
 Art
 The Play What I Wrote
 God of Carnage

Tours
 The Blues Brothers
Art
 Rebecca
 The Play What I Wrote
 Calendar Girls
 Brief Encounter
  The Full Monty
   "A Passionate Woman"
   The Band
 Calendar Girls The Musical

References

British theatre managers and producers
Living people
1969 births
Duos